New beat is a Belgian electronic dance music genre that fuses elements of new wave, hi-NRG, EBM and hip hop (e.g. scratching). It flourished in Western Europe during the late-1980s.

New beat spawned a subgenre called "hard beat" (a blend of EBM, new beat and acid house) and became a key influence on the evolution of European electronic dance music styles such as Belgian techno, hardcore techno and gabber.

History 
New beat originated in Belgium in 1987, and was popular in several music clubs across Western Europe. Sometimes described as "new wave disco beat" the genre has been characterized as a blend of new wave, hi-NRG, EBM (which also developed in Belgium), and acid house. New beat is the immediate precursor of hardcore electronic dance music, which developed in Belgium, the Netherlands, and Germany around 1990. Belgium's native form of hardcore that emerged from new beat is also known as Belgian techno or rave techno.  

The genre was "accidentally invented" in the nightclub Ancienne Belgique (AB) in Antwerp when DJ Dikke Ronny (literally "Fat Ronny") played the 45 rpm EBM record "Flesh" by A Split-Second at 33 rpm, with the pitch control set to +8. In addition to A Split-Second, new beat was also heavily influenced by other EBM acts such as Front 242, Signal Aout 42 and the Neon Judgement, as well as new wave acts such as Fad Gadget, Gary Numan, New Order, Boytronic and Anne Clark. Nightclubs such as the Boccaccio soon made the genre a major success.

In contrast to EBM, new beat records did not appear within a certain subcultural context and were mostly produced to enter the international music charts. In Belgium, compilations such as New Beat Take 1 sold 40.000 units. The Belgian sound was re-introduced to the United States market in 1989 through a compilation album known as This Is the New Beat, released through Polygram Records.

From 1988 to 1990, new beat spawned two short-lived subgenres with hard beat, a style that incorporated more elements of EBM (e.g. the Concrete Beat – "I Want You"; Major Problem – "I Still Have a Dream"; Tribe 22 – "Acid-New Beat"), and skizzo, a techno-influenced style, considerably faster than the original slow new beat style.

The most commercially successful new beat groups were Confetti's and Lords of Acid, who received heavy airplay on the MTV Europe show Party Zone. A memorable novelty song was "Qui...?" (1989) by Brussels Sound Revolution, who sampled parts of a press conference speech by former prime minister Paul Vanden Boeynants after he was kidnapped by the gang of Patrick Haemers. The Bassline Boys attracted controversy, on the other hand, with their single Warbeat (1989), which sampled the voice of Adolf Hitler.

New beat bands include A Split-Second, Ibiza, Lords of Acid, 101, Public Relations and Technotronic, while Belgian hardcore techno bands that emerged from the hard beat and skizzo subgenres include Set Up System, T99, Channel X, Praga Khan, Cubic 22, Meng Syndicate and the Immortals.

Modern "new beat" 
Modern new beat is known as midtempo bass. Modern artists described as "new beat" include 1788-L, and Rezz. Notaker described the subgenre as a "fresh sound that’s been generally unexplored in the mainstream electronic realm," further commenting on the versatility of the subgenre, stating "the range of which you can produce in this tempo range can be extremely gritty and heavy to really melodic and beautiful to calm, relaxing and atmospheric." Rezz's studio album Certain Kind of Magic peaked at number 12 on the US Billboard Dance/Electronic Albums and her previous album Mass Manipulation received the Electronic Album of the Year awarded at the Juno Awards.  The Belgian band Psy'Aviah has opened for Praga Khan a number of times, and shows New Beat influence in songs such as "In Silence."

Record labels
The rise of the new genre did not only launch new artists; a few new record labels also were set up, especially to release new beat records. They lived a golden era with, despite not being mainstream, massive sales, and not only in their home country Belgium but also in the rest of Europe and specifically Ireland and the United Kingdom. Roland Beelen (Bellucci of the above-mentioned Morton Sherman Bellucci) and Maurice Engelen (of Praga Khan) set up Antler-Subway Records. There was also R&S Records, launched by Renaat Vandepapeliere and his wife. Other labels include ARS, PIAS, ZYX Records and Music Man.

See also
 Popcorn – a Belgian music scene of the 1970s and 1980s based on dancing to slower or slowed down soul music
 The Sound of Belgium – a documentary that covers the Belgian perspective on subjects including Electronic Body Music and New Beat

External links

 Belgian Pop & Rock Archives
 New Beat Flashback – Interviews and Information: V.J. Marcel Vanthilt from MTV Europe talks about New Beat and take interviews in English. The rest of the clip is in Flemish/Dutch
 Radio Soulwax on New Beat

References

 
Electronic dance music genres
Belgian styles of music
Electronic body music
Industrial music